Louise Kristensen (born 4 September 1992) is a former Danish handball player who last played for Aarhus United.

References

1992 births
Living people
People from Aarhus Municipality
Danish female handball players
Sportspeople from the Central Denmark Region